HMS Vindictive has been the name of several Royal Navy ships

  was the six-gun galley Lee of the Georgia Navy that  and  captured on the Savannah River in April 1779. The Royal Navy took Lee into service as Vindictive and sold her at Jamaica in 1786.
  was the Dutch navy's frigate Bellona launched at Rotterdam in 1786 that the Royal Navy captured at the Capitulation of Saldanha Bay in 1796 and broke up in 1816.
 , a 74-gun third rate ship of the line launched in 1813 and sold in 1871.
 , an Arrogant-class cruiser used in the Zeebrugge Raid
 , a Hawkins-class cruiser built in 1918 and converted to an aircraft carrier

Royal Navy ship names